Indian potato is a common name for several plants and may refer to:

Apios americana, a terrestrial plant native to eastern North America
Orogenia, a formerly recognized plant genus native to western North America, now included in Lomatium
Sagittaria latifolia, an aquatic plant native to North and South America